"Love Vigilantes" is a song by English rock band New Order. It first appeared as the opening track of their third studio album, Low-Life (1985). The song is a departure from New Order's usual style in many ways. Described by AllMusic as "at its core a campfire singalong", "Love Vigilantes" is decidedly pop and shows inspiration from American country and folk music. In a 2014 list compiled by The Guardian, "Love Vigilantes" was ranked ninth in a list of the ten best New Order songs.

Lyrics
According to Bernard Sumner, "Love Vigilantes" is one of the few songs for which he started out wanting to tell a story rather than his usual method of listening to a newly composed piece and writing lyrics to match the mood of the music. Having "decided to write a Redneck song", Sumner's lyrics tell a rather "tongue-in-cheek" tale of a soldier returning home from Vietnam only to find that his wife had received a telegram informing her that he had died. Sumner further relates that the ending is open to interpretation; either the soldier had actually died and returns as a ghost, or the telegram was sent mistakenly and he is quite alive. Either way, he finds her lying on the floor, having committed suicide with the telegram in her hand, an ending Sumner describes as "a very country tragedy".

The subject of the song is close to the one of "Vietnam", the 1969 Jimmy Cliff standard covered by New Order in 2003 for War Child's Hope album.

Music
The music of "Love Vigilantes" forgoes most of the electronics that otherwise define New Order's typical sound. After an opening of four hits on a snare drum, the music is built around multiple hooks, starting with the intro theme, which Spin magazine called "Beatlesque", played by Sumner on a melodica followed by his acoustic guitar riff which repeats throughout the song. Combined with a synthesized low end and Peter Hook's higher "twangy" bass, this new sound for New Order was "gorgeously lush" and "unlike anything that New Order has attempted before".

Covers
Iron & Wine (2009)
Duncan Sheik (2011)
Comet Gain
Digital
Hideki Yoshimura
Hungry Lucy
Love Seed Mama Jump
Oyster Band
Pato Fu
Poi Dog Pondering
Superchunk
Laura Cantrell
Laura Cantrell and Ted Leo
Tom Phillips (2015)
Jackie Oates & Megan Henwood (2016)
Eve St. Jones

References

New Order (band) songs
1985 songs
Songs written by Bernard Sumner
Songs written by Peter Hook
Songs written by Stephen Morris (musician)
Songs written by Gillian Gilbert
Songs of the Vietnam War